The Angolan Swimming Federation, is the national governing body for the sport of swimming in Angola.

References

External links
  

National members of the African Swimming Confederation
Sports governing bodies in Angola
Swimming in Angola
1976 establishments in Angola
Sports organizations established in 1976